Spårvägens SF, Spårvägens Simförening,  is a Swedish swim team based in western Stockholm. It is a part of Spårvägens GoIF and started in 1946 by the Swedish champion on 200m and 400m Breaststroke Gunnar Sulling and Gunnar 'Hacke' Gustafsson for the employees of Stockholms Spårvägar. Since the late 1950s the club has been open for persons not working for Stockholms Spårvägar. During the 1970s it was a farm club for the competitive team SKK-Spårvägen consisting of Spårvägen and Stockholms KK. The best swimmer in recent times is former world record holder Emma Igelström.

Swimmers
Anthony Ervin (2006)
Anders Holmertz
Mikael Holmertz
Emma Igelström
Louise Jöhncke
Johanna Sjöberg

External links
Spårvägens SF's Official Homepage

References

Swimming clubs in Sweden
Sports clubs established in 1946
Sport in Stockholm